The 1936 Middle Tennessee State Teachers Blue Raiders football team was an American football team that represented Middle Tennessee State Teachers College (now known as Middle Tennessee State University) as a member of the Southern Intercollegiate Athletic Association during the 1936 college football season. In their third season under head coach Johnny Floyd, Middle Tennessee compiled a 7–1 record and finished as SIAA co-champion. The team's captain was Miles Baskins.

Schedule

References

Middle Tennessee State Teachers
Middle Tennessee Blue Raiders football seasons
Middle Tennessee State Teachers Blue Raiders football